Air Force Golden Jubilee Institute, located at Subroto Park, Delhi Cantonment, India, is a school run by the Indian Air Force Educational and Cultural Society. It was founded in 1985.

The school has an auditorium named as Rabindralaya. There are three separate 'wings' in the school. The Special wing is dedicated for education of special needs. The Junior wing has classes Kindergarten to V. The Senior wing has classes VI to XII.

The school was established primarily for the benefit of children of Indian Air Force personnel. It is open to children of Army and Navy personnel as well as to civilians. The Air Force Golden Jubilee Institute is a co-educational public school.

The school, and its sister schools, Air Force Bal Bharati School and The Air Force School are run by the Indian Air Force Educational and Cultural Society.

History
On completion of Golden Jubilee Year of Indian Air Force, this Institute established in 1985. It started as a school for children with special needs. The school was extended and made a public school the following year.

Academics
The institution follows the Central Board of Secondary Education curriculum and is affiliated to the same with the medium of instruction as English. At the time of admission, in consultation with the trained physician/psychologist, counselor, special educators and social workers, children are placed in mildly, moderately and severely retarded categories. This helps to assess their chronological and mental ages and levels of abilities from age groups of 6 to 18 years.

Progress is monitored through Individualized Education Plans in which long-term and short-term goals are defined and methods are adopted to achieve these goals. The academic program consists of reading/writing simple arithmetic of Primary level, environmental awareness and home management program. The Integrated Program consists of drawing, music, dance, creative art and craft, physical training, morning assemblies, special-assemblies on special days like Christmas, Diwali, school annual day, annual sports day and visits of eminent persons.

Vocational training is provided to the special students in fields of home management, paper products, printing, Xeroxing, weaving, candle-making and computers. Teacher and student volunteers work with these students and help them in their endeavor.

The school is a member of the National Progressive School Conference. It is also a member of the Indian Public Schools Conference.

Sports and co-curricular activities

The institute has facilities for athletics, basketball, volleyball, table tennis, badminton and traditional sports like kho-kho. Coaches and physical education teachers under the guidance of the Principal train the students to participate in inter-house and inter-school sports competitions at the district level. Several students have won laurels at the various Zonal Athletic Meets, CBSE Tournaments and the Inter-Command Air Force Schools Sports Meets. A sports meet is held annually during which inter-house competitions are held for the senior, junior and special wing.

Socially Useful Productive Work classes are integrated in the curriculum giving the students an outlet to develop their skills in dancing, instrumental music, art, tinkering with electronic gadgets etc. These clubs organize activities and prepare students for competitions. On the occasion of the Annual Day celebrations, students showcase dances, music forms and drama. This also includes performances by the specially-abled students.

Notable alumni
 Sushmita Sen, ex-Miss India and Miss Universe, movie star and celebrity.
 Himanshu Malik, ex-Vimal male model and movie star
 Niharika Acharya, managing editor, Voice Of America's India Service
 Shaili Chopra, senior editor and Primetime Anchor at ET Now, the Economic Times Business News Channel
 Pariva Pranati, TV actress
 Chirag Paswan, Member of Parliament, LJP

See also 
 No. 1 Air Force School, Gwalior
 Air Force School Coimbatore
 Air Force Bal Bharati School, Lodi Road
 Air Force School Kanpur
 The Air Force School (Subroto Park)

References 

Schools in Delhi
1985 establishments in Delhi
Educational institutions established in 1985